Suter Island is a small island off the Vestfold Hills, lying   southwest of the south entrance point to Heidemann Bay. Mapped by Norwegian cartographers from air photos taken by the Lars Christensen Expedition, 1936–37. Named by Antarctic Names Committee of Australia (ANCA) for William James (Bill) Suter, cook at Davis Station in 1960.

See also 
 List of antarctic and sub-antarctic islands

Islands of Princess Elizabeth Land